Bolkiah bin Ismail is a Malaysian politician who served as the State Minister of Industrial Development. He served as the Member of Sabah State Legislative Assembly (MLA) for Pitas from March 2008 until September 2020.

Election results

Honours

Honours of Malaysia
  :
  Officer of the Order of the Defender of the Realm (KMN) (2010)
  :
  Commander of the Order of Kinabalu (PGDK) – Datuk (2009)

References

Members of the Sabah State Legislative Assembly
United Malays National Organisation politicians
Living people
Year of birth missing (living people)
Officers of the Order of the Defender of the Realm
Commanders of the Order of Kinabalu
Former Sabah Heritage Party politicians